The Fabulous Baker Boys is an album by American pianist Dave Grusin released in 1989, recorded for the GRP label. This album is the soundtrack to the motion picture The Fabulous Baker Boys directed by Steve Kloves. The album reached No. 3 on Billboard's Jazz chart.

Grusin's score received numerous accolades, including an 1989 Academy Award nomination for Best Original Score, a 1990 Golden Globe nomination for Best Original Score, a 1990 nomination for the BAFTA Award for Best Film Music, and was the 1990 Grammy winner for the best score soundtrack for visual media.

Track listing
All tracks written by Dave Grusin except where noted
"Main Title – Jack's Theme" - 6:40
"Welcome to the Road" - 5:33
"Makin' Whoopee" (Walter Donaldson, Gus Kahn) - 3:09
"Suzie and Jack" - 5:00
"Shop Till You Bop" - 4:35
"Soft on Me" - 2:30
"Do Nothing till You Hear from Me" (Duke Ellington, Bob Russell) - 3:26
"The Moment of Truth" - 3:55
"Moonglow" (Irving Mills, Eddie DeLange) - 3:25
"Lullaby of Birdland" (George Shearing, George David Weiss) - 2:32
"My Funny Valentine" (Richard Rodgers, Lorenz Hart) - 3:02

Personnel
 Dave Grusin – Fender Rhodes electric piano, piano, synthesizer, conductor
 Ernie Watts – saxophone
 Sal Marquez – trumpet
 Lee Ritenour – guitar
 Brian Bromberg, J. J. Wiggins, Ernie McDaniel – bass
 Harvey Mason, Rocky White, Gene Krupa, Earl Palmer – drums
 Michelle Pfeiffer – vocals
 Norris Turney, The Mariano-Dodgion Sextet - alto saxophone
 The Mariano-Dodgion Sextet, Charles Owens, Eddie Daniels, Herman Riley, Benny Goodman - clarinet
 Charles Owens - bass clarinet
 Mercer Ellington - conductor
 Roland Hanna, Teddy Wilson, Karen Hernandez - piano
 Eddie Daniels, Herman Riley - tenor saxophone
 Al Grey, Britt Woodman - trombone
 Chuck Connors - bass trombone
 Barry Lee Hall, Clark Terry, Lew Soloff, Ron Tooley - trumpet, flugelhorn
 Lionel Hampton - vibraphone, vocals

Charts

References

External links
Dave Grusin-The Fabulous Baker Boys at Discogs
The Fabulous Baker Boys Soundtrack Reviewed
The Fabulous Baker Boys at AllMusic

1989 soundtrack albums
GRP Records albums
Dave Grusin soundtracks